Timothy Walter Boden (19 May 1901 – 5 September 1969) was an English cricketer who played for Derbyshire in 1920.

Boden was born at Sherborne, Dorset. His grandfather, Henry, and great-uncle Walter were present at the inaugural meeting of Derbyshire County Cricket Club in 1870 and both played first-class cricket in the latter half of the 19th century. Boden was educated at Eton and played in the Eton v Harrow matches in 1918.

Boden played in one game for Derbyshire during the 1920 season which was against Sussex in August. Boden played in the middle order and made 5 and 9 in his two first-class innings.

Boden married Pauline Alison Copland. He died at Churchill, Axminster, Devon at the age of 68.

References 

1901 births
1969 deaths
People educated at Eton College
People from Sherborne
Cricketers from Dorset
English cricketers
Derbyshire cricketers